The 2014–15 Morehead State Eagles men's basketball team represented Morehead State University during the 2014–15 NCAA Division I men's basketball season. The Eagles, led by third year head coach Sean Woods, played their home games at Ellis Johnson Arena and were members of the East Division of the Ohio Valley Conference. They finished the season 17–17, 10–6 in OVC play to finish in third place in the East Division. They advanced to the semifinals of the OVC tournament where they lost to Murray State.

Roster

Schedule

|-
!colspan=9 style="background:#000099; color:#FFD51D;"| Exhibition

|-
!colspan=9 style="background:#000099; color:#FFD51D;"| Regular season

|-
!colspan=9 style="background:#000099; color:#FFD51D;"|Ohio Valley tournament

References

Morehead State Eagles men's basketball seasons
Morehead State